Kryptos is a genus of large sea snails, whelks, a marine gastropod molluscs in the family Colidae, the true whelks and the like.

Description

Species
 Kryptos koehleri (Locard, 1896)
 Kryptos tholoides (Watson, 1882)
Species brought into synonymy
 Kryptos elegans Dautzenberg & H. Fischer, 1896: synonym of Kryptos koehleri (Locard, 1896)
 Kryptos explorator Fraussen & Sellanes, 2008: synonym of Jerrybuccinum explorator (Fraussen & Sellanes, 2008)

References

 Bouchet P. & Warén A. (1985). Revision of the Northeast Atlantic bathyal and abyssal Neogastropoda excluding Turridae (Mollusca, Gastropoda). Bollettino Malacologico Suppl. 1: 121-296

External links
 Dautzenberg, P. & Fischer, H. (1896). Dragages effectués par l'Hirondelle et par la Princesse Alice 1888-1895. 1. Mollusques Gastéropodes. Mémoires de la Société Zoologique de France. 9: 395-498, pl. 15-22
 Bouchet, P. & Warén, A. (1986). Mollusca Gastropoda: Taxonomical notes on tropical deep water Buccinidae with descriptions of new taxa. in: Forest, J. (Ed.) Résultats des Campagnes MUSORSTOM I et II Philippines (1976, 1980). Tome 2. Mémoires du Muséum national d'Histoire naturelle. Série A, Zoologie. 133: 457-499

Colidae
Gastropod genera